Wooded Landscape with a Herdsman Seated is an oil painting by Thomas Gainsborough, from 1748.
It is in the collection of Gainsborough's House.

Description
The painting's dimensions are 49 × 65 centimeters. 
It is an early landscape attributed to Great Henny, near Sudbury, Suffolk.

Provenance
The painting was sold at Christie's 1985, and sold at Sotheby's in 1986.
It was purchased with support from the National Art Collections Fund, for £220,000, in 1990.

References

External links

Landscape paintings by Thomas Gainsborough
1748 paintings